Cape Kiwanda State Natural Area is a state park in Pacific City, Oregon, United States. Cape Kiwanda is on the Three Capes Scenic Route, which includes Cape Meares and Cape Lookout. Hiking to the top of Cape Kiwanda allows views of Nestucca Bay to the south and Cape Lookout to the north.

It is one of three features along the Oregon Coast that are called "Haystack Rock", though the one in Cannon Beach is more widely known.

One of the attractions, called the Duckbill, in the park was destroyed by vandals in August 2016.

See also 
 List of Oregon state parks
 Haystack Rock in Cannon Beach, Clatsop County

References

External links 

 

State parks of Oregon
Parks in Tillamook County, Oregon
Kiwanda, Cape
Oregon Coast
Surfing locations in the United States
Landforms of Tillamook County, Oregon